The Manila Electric Company, also known as Meralco (stylized in uppercase), is an electric power distribution company in the Philippines. It is Metro Manila's only electric power distributor and holds the power distribution franchise for 22 cities and 89 municipalities, including the whole of the National Capital Region and the exurbs that form Mega Manila.

The name "Meralco" is an acronym for Manila Electric Railroad and Light Company, which was the company's official name until 1919.

History

La Electricista
Organized in 1891 and beginning operations in late 2000, La Electricista was the first electric company to provide electricity to Manila towards the close of the Spanish era. La Electricista had built a central power plant on Calle San Sebastian (now Hidalgo Street) in Quiapo, Manila. On January 17, 1895, its streetlights were turned on for the first time and by 1903, it had about 3,000 electric light customers.

Founding of the Manila Electric Railroad and Light Company
On October 20, 1902, during the American Colonial Period, the Second Philippine Commission began accepting bids to operate Manila's electric tramway, and by extension, providing electricity to the city and its suburbs. Detroit entrepreneur Charles M. Swift was the sole bidder and on March 24, 1903, was granted the original basic franchise of the Manila Electric Company. March 24 thus is marked annually as the company's anniversary.

The Manila Electric Company acquired both La Electricista and the Compañía de los Tranvías de Filipinas, a firm that ran Manila's horse-drawn tramways which was founded in 1882. Construction on the electric tramway began that same year. In addition to acquiring La Electricista's Calle San Sebastian power plant, the company built its own steam generating plant on Isla Provisora (later becoming the Manila Thermal Power Plant), which powered the tram system and eventually also the electric service. By 1906, the Manila Electric Company's annual power output capacity was around eight million kWh.

Manila Suburban Railways Company
Swift was awarded another franchise in 1906 to operate a  extension line from Paco to Fort McKinley and Pasig and founded the Manila Suburban Railway to operate this franchise. In 1919 this company merged with the Manila Electric Company. This extension was one of the most profitable of MERALCO's lines.

By the 1920, MERALCO had a 170-strong fleet of streetcars, before switching over to buses later in that decade.

The company operated 52-miles of trams until World War II. The equipment and tracks of the system was severely damaged during the war and had to be removed.

Power generation and distribution

By 1915, electricity generation and distribution became the main MERALCO's main income generator, overtaking its public transportation operations in terms of revenue. In 1919, it changed its official name to Manila Electric Company. By 1920, the company's power capacity had grown to 45 million kWh.

In 1925, MERALCO was acquired by the utility holding company Associated Gas and Electric, which had begun a massive expansion throughout the United States and Canada. With AGECO's financial backing, MERALCO began acquiring a number of existing utility companies in the Philippines, enabling the company to expand beyond Manila.

By 1930, MERALCO had completed construction of the Philippine's first hydroelectric power plant, the 23MW Botocan Hydro Station. At the time, this plant was one of the largest engineering projects in Asia and constituted the largest single private capital investment in the Philippines. The additional capacity allowed the company to begin hooking up customers throughout the metropolitan area.

To drive demand for more power, MERALCO also opened a retail store in order to sell electric home appliances.

World War II
During the Second World War, the Japanese occupying forces forcibly transferred all of MERALCO's assets and holdings to the Japanese-controlled Taiwan Power Company.

Postwar

By war's end, most of the former Meralco facilities had been destroyed. AGECO was reorganized as General Public Utilities Corporation or GPU in 1946. MERALCO's autobus franchise was sold to Halili Transport.

Acquisition by the López group

In 1962, Eugenio López, Sr. of the influential López family of Iloilo put together Meralco Securities Corporation (MSC), which acquired MERALCO, making it wholly Filipino-owned. During 1962-72, he increased MERALCO's power generating capacity by five times with the building of additional power stations in the Manila area with two more planned in Rizal Province.

The Meralco Building, designed by National Artist of the Philippines for Architecture José María Zaragoza, was built during this period. The Meralco Theater within it was inaugurated shortly thereafter, in March 1969.

Martial law and Romualdez takeover
In September 1972, President Ferdinand Marcos, who had begun feuding with the Lopezes, declared Martial Law, acquiring and consolidating power and effectively extending his beyond the constitutional term limit which would have forced him to step down in 1973. A few weeks later in November 1972, he issued Presidential Decree № 40, which nationalized the country's electric generation and transmission. A few more weeks after that, Marcos had Lopez' son and namesake, Eugenio "Geny" Lopez, Jr. arrested without formal charges, claiming that the younger Lopez had been involved in an alleged assassination attempt against him. 

Geny's arrest became a bargaining chip which eventually compelled the Lopezes to sell their controlling share of Meralco Securities Corporation to Marcos' associates late in 1973. Ownership of Meralco Securities Corporation was placed under a newly created shell company called the Meralco Foundation, Inc., controlled by Marcos' brother-in-law Benjamin Romualdez, which made a downpayment of about $1,500 for a "very minimal" total sale price of about $28 million (200 million pesos at the prevailing rate). Installment payments were supposed to be due starting two years later.

The Meralco Foundation takeover was immediately followed by a 100% increase in electric rates, with continuous increases throughout Romualdez' management. A rate adjustment clause, which allowed MERALCO to adjust its rates depending on crude oil increase or higher dollar exchange rates, was also introduced.

In 1977, MSC was renamed First Philippine Holdings Corporation. 

By 1978, all of the Philippines' major power plants were owned and operated by Napocor, including the Metro Manila plants that MERALCO had built beforehand in the 1960s. By the end of the Martial Law period in 1981, MERALCO expanded even further into Cavite and western parts of Laguna, Rizal and Quezon provinces, as well as parts of southern Bulacan.

Meralco Foundation's control of MERALCO lasted until the People Power Revolution in 1985 when it defaulted on its payments under the terms of the original turnover of shares in 1973, although it took a five year period before the shares were eventually reverted to the Lopezes in 1991.

After martial law

President Corazon Aquino reverted company ownership to the López Group. She also enacted an executive order that allowed the company to directly compete with Napocor. 

On March 18, 1989, MERALCO unveiled its new and current corporate logo.

Entry of First Pacific and JG Summit groups
Between 2009 and 2012, the López Group would reduce its 33.4% holdings in MERALCO by selling most of its shares to the First Pacific Group. By 2012, the López Group's holdings in MERALCO would be reduced to 3.95%.

The First Pacific Group, through Beacon Electric Asset Holdings Inc. and Metro Pacific Investment Corporation, currently holds 45.46% share in MERALCO, followed by the JG Summit Group with 29.56%, for a combined 75.02% control of MERALCO.

Early renewal initiatives during the 16th Congress

In 2014 and 2015, MERALCO requested the 16th Congress to tackle the extension of its franchise early, although its renewal was not due until six years later, in 2020.

Controversies

2008 legislative investigation on high power rates
Meralco is facing a Philippine legislative inquiry/investigation for alleged excessive pricing. The government has considered a plan to take over Meralco, to reduce electricity bills. Meralco and National Transmission Corporation (TransCo) blamed each other for the high power rates. Meralco also blames high power generation costs, high transmission costs and government taxes imposed on the electricity sector from power generation to distribution. Government Service Insurance System (GSIS) President Winston García, however, blamed Meralco's inefficiency, its "bloated bureaucracy" and its sourcing of power from independent power producers (IPPs) also owned by the López Family, and the need to amend the Electric Power Industry Reform Act (EPIRA) of 2001. Oscar López said that if the GSIS would buy the Meralco shares, they must buy in whole cash, while many businessmen also said that taking over Meralco is not the way to reduce electrical price, which depends on the national government and the President. The issue was also seen as a purposeful diversion from the then-ongoing ZTE NBN scandal and other government issues. A perceived lack of general understanding regarding the issue of system loss, inherent in the business of utilities prompted Meralco's former holding company, First Philippine Holdings, to issue advertisements explaining systems loss.

Syndicated estafa and bribery case
The Department of Justice (Philippines) filed syndicated (fraud) charges against Meralco in its August 22, 2008 31-page resolution, filed with the Pasig Regional Trial Court. The May 29 National Association of Electricity Consumers for Reform (Nasecore) complaint accused Meralco of "illegally declaring as income ₱889 million in consumers’ money, which represents interest from meter and bill deposits consumers had been paying since 1995." No bail was recommended for all the accused, 2006 officers of Meralco, to wit: Meralco chairman and CEO Manuel Lopez, executive vice president and chief financial officer Daniel Tagaza, first Vice-resident and treasurer Rafael Andrada, vice president and corporate auditor and compliance officer Helen De Guzman, vice president and assistant comptroller Antonio Valera, and senior assistant vice president and assistant treasurer Manolo Fernando; 2006 Meralco directors Arthur Defensor Jr., Gregory Domingo, Octavio Victor Espiritu, Christian Monsod, Federico Puno, Washington Sycip, Emilio Vicens, Francisco Viray and former Prime Minister Cesar Virata.

Nasecore's complaint accusing Meralco of "illegally declaring as income 889 million pesos in consumers’ money, which represents interest from meter and bill deposits consumers had been paying since 1995," was immediately refuted by the accused company as the alleged ₱889 million only stemmed from a generally accepted accounting principle of reversing Meralco's earlier provision for meter deposit interests which, earlier set at 10% per annum was deemed too high and was set to the recommended 6%. Meralco also questioned how a syndicated estafa case can arise when it has already announced and committed that it will be refunding to customers who paid meter deposit principals plus interest months ahead of the ERC prescribed schedule and has allocated enough funds for the said refund.

Meralco is also involved in the GSIS-Meralco bribery case.

Dismissal of syndicated estafa case
On October 6, 2008, the Pasig Regional Trial Court Branch 71 dismissed the syndicated estafa case filed against the Meralco board of directors, for the prosecution failed to establish all the elements of syndicated estafa.

Presiding Judge Franco Falcon, pointed out in the ruling that the board is not the kind described by the law as being formed to perpetrate an illegal act for the board of directors were elected by stockholders. The court explained, "Therefore, the accused can never be charged of taking part in the commission of syndicated estafa not only because they are not part of a syndicate as contemplated by law in PD 1689, but more so, because there was absolutely no estafa committed."

According to Philippine law, to constitute syndicated estafa, the subject money or property must be received by the offenders. The money represents the accrued interests on the bill and meter deposits, which were paid by Meralco customers, not directly to the board, but to the various Meralco business centers where the customers transacted. Meralco expressed elation over the dismissal.

Service area 

Meralco serves Metro Manila, where it is the sole electricity distributor, as well as some nearby provinces, like Bulacan, Cavite, Laguna, Batangas, Rizal, Quezon. Bulacan, Cavite, and Rizal are solely served by Meralco, but on some provinces, it only serves some parts, like in Laguna, Batangas, and Quezon, where most or some areas are served by electric cooperatives. In Laguna and Quezon, most part of those provinces are served by the company, but other areas, mostly rural municipalities, are served by electric cooperatives. In Batangas, only Santo Tomas, the First Philippine Industrial Park and First Industrial Township SEZ both in Tanauan, Batangas City, San Pascual and parts of Laurel (Barangays of Niyugan and Dayap Itaas) and Calaca (parts of Barangay Cahil) which facing Tagaytay–Nasugbu Highway are served by Meralco, and the rest of the province are franchise areas of electric cooperatives. In Pampanga, some barangays in Candaba are served by the company.

Ownership
Beacon Electric Asset Holdings, Inc.: 34.96%
JG Summit Holdings, Inc.: 29.56%
Others/Public stock: 21%
Metro Pacific Investments Corporation: 10.5%
First Philippine Holdings Corporation: 3.94%
First Philippine Utilities Corporation: 0.01%

Sports teams
Meralco Reddy Kilowatts (MICAA basketball team)
Meralco Bolts (PBA team)
FC Meralco Manila (Philippines Football League team)
Meralco Power Spikers (Shakey's V-League and Philippine Super Liga team)

See also 
John F. Cotton Corporate Wellness Center

References 

Electric power companies of the Philippines
Companies listed on the Philippine Stock Exchange
Companies based in Pasig